Israel Harding, VC (21 October 1833 – 22 May 1917) was a sailor in the Royal Navy and a recipient of the Victoria Cross, the highest award for gallantry in the face of the enemy that can be awarded to British and Commonwealth forces.

Naval career
Harding was 48 years old, and a gunner in the Royal Navy during the 1882 Anglo-Egyptian War when the following deed took place for which he was awarded the Victoria Cross (VC).

On 11 July 1882 at Alexandria, Egypt, with other ships, was bombarding the forts of the city and suffering damage and casualties from the enemy's guns. During the engagement a 10-inch shell passed through the ship's side and lodged on the main deck. Gunner Harding, hearing a shout that there was a live shell just above the hatchway (which led to the magazine) rushed up from below, picked it up and flung it into a tub of water. Had the shell burst it would probably have caused many deaths.

On return to England the Victoria Cross was presented to him by Edward, Prince of Wales.

Harding later achieved the rank of chief gunner. His VC is on display in the Lord Ashcroft Gallery at the Imperial War Museum in London.

References

External links
Burial location of Israel Harding "Hampshire"
News item "Israel Harding's Victoria Cross sold at auction"

British recipients of the Victoria Cross
1833 births
1917 deaths
Royal Navy sailors
Royal Navy personnel of the Anglo-Egyptian War
Royal Navy personnel of the Crimean War
British military personnel of the Third Anglo-Ashanti War
Royal Navy recipients of the Victoria Cross
People from Billingshurst
Military personnel from Portsmouth
Burials in Hampshire